Édouard Charton (11 May 1807 – 27 February 1890) was an eminent French literary figure who was the founder and, for fifty-five years (1833–88), editor-in-chief of the publication Le Magazin pittoresque, in addition to serving for thirty years (1860–90) as director of publication for Hachette.

Biography
A native of Sens in the Bourgogne région, Édouard Charton trained as a lawyer, receiving his degree at the age of 20. His first great dedication to a cause came two years later when, during 1829–31, using his oratorical skills, he became a traveling propagator for the social philosophy of Saint-Simonism, which ultimately resulted for him in great disappointment.

From his mid-forties onward, he spent many years in politics, serving in the National Assembly as Deputy and Senator, expressing his convictions which formed a continuation and refinement of the previous century's Age of Enlightenment: faith in progress and the emancipation of people through education; respect for human dignity, constant fight for the dissemination of knowledge and political action in favor of liberal and republican ideas.

He reaffirmed the moral values acquired within his family and found inspiration in the works of Louis Claude de Saint-Martin, the mystic who used "Unknown Philosopher" as his pen name. He also gathered experience in philanthropy, discovered the problems involved in the social condition of man, tested solutions, and worked for what he felt were noble causes, establishing durable and useful friendships with men who shared common ideals.

In 1833 he put into effect his ideals of "fighting ignorance" by starting a new publication Le Magasin pittoresque (pittoresque means that the publication was illustrated). He was inspired by the British Penny Magazine.
He remained at the helm director of the successful enterprise until 1888, past his eightieth birthday. For more than a half-century, he always pursued the same aims, while collecting and writing texts, selecting engravings, and supervising the printing and distribution of what he referred to as an "out-of-order encyclopedia".

Applying the same rigor and consistency, he chose the best collaborators to propagate practical knowledge while stimulating curiosity and forming artistic tastes. L'Illustration, a renowned pictorial review, created in 1843 on his initiative, lasted a century (to 1944). In 1860, he embarked upon a working partnership with Louis Hachette and his successors, which would continue for the remaining thirty years of his life. It gave him the opportunity to reach new readers with the travel and exploration review Le Tour du Monde (World Tour) and the scientific publication Bibliothèque des merveilles (Library of Wonders).
 
Based on the conviction that man could improve and progress through the acquisition of knowledge, Charton applied his considerable efforts disseminating "practical knowledge" to the greatest number, using his great writing talent only to inform and provide moral guidance. After the French Revolution of 1848, his friend Hippolyte Carnot, who was appointed the Minister of Public Instruction and Religion, recruited Charton as Secretary General of the Ministry. It was the beginning of his political career.

Although an opponent of Napoleon III's 1852 Second Empire, Charton adapted to the circumstances, without ever denying his Republican convictions. He promoted public reading with the creation of popular libraries, participated in the creation of the Paris Museum of Anthropology and showed throughout his life a consistency of behavior as testified by his friends and two generations of colleagues.

He was described as a man of action able to overcome his anxiety-ridden personal nature. Faithful in friendship, he maintained relations with those who shared his belief in the moral progress of man, whereby the progress of each individual led to the progress of humanity as a whole. In the National Assembly, he remained in the background despite his talents as a speaker. When he did take the floor, it was to raise crucial points speak concerning questions of education, fine arts and the press, as well as to express his opposition to the death penalty.

Encouraging his colleagues to reach a consensus, he could also remain firm and intransigent on points of principle. During the Second Empire, he turned down the post of director of the Comédie française which would have necessitated swearing an oath to the Emperor. 
Political misalliances prevented him from attaining what would have been the crowning glories of his life—serving as Head of Administration, or as Minister of Fine Arts, both opportunities to demonstrate his organizational talents.

Édouard Charton died in Versailles at the age of 82.

References
Lagarde-Fouquet, A. and Lagarde, C. (2006).  Édouard Charton et le combat contre l'ignorance [Édouard Charton and the Battle Against Ignorance], 248p. Rennes: Collection Carnot, Presses Universitaires de Rennes.

External links
 
 
 
 Edouard Charton by Annie Lagarde-Fouquet in French
 Magasin pittoresque in French
 Le Tour du Monde in French
 Le Tour du Monde a été fondé par Édouard Charton en 1860
 la Bibliothèque des Merveilles in French

1807 births
1890 deaths
People from Sens
French republicans
Members of the 1848 Constituent Assembly
Members of the National Assembly (1871)
French Senators of the Third Republic
Senators of Yonne
19th-century French lawyers
French humanists
French political writers
French science writers
French travel writers
19th-century French journalists
French male journalists
French male essayists
19th-century French historians
19th-century French essayists
19th-century French male writers
Burials at the Cemetery of Saint-Louis, Versailles
French magazine founders